King's Highway 401, commonly referred to as Highway 401 and also known by its official name as the Macdonald–Cartier Freeway or colloquially referred to as the four-oh-one,
is a controlled-access 400-series highway in the Canadian province of Ontario. It stretches  from Windsor in the west to the Ontario–Quebec border in the east. The part of Highway 401 that passes through Toronto is North America's busiest highway, and one of the widest.
Together with Quebec Autoroute 20, it forms the road transportation backbone of the Quebec City–Windsor Corridor, along which over half of Canada's population resides. It is also a Core Route in the National Highway System of Canada.
The route is maintained by the Ministry of Transportation of Ontario (MTO) and patrolled by the Ontario Provincial Police. The speed limit is  throughout its length, with the only exceptions the posted  limit westbound in Windsor and in most construction zones, along with a  speed limit between Windsor and Tilbury.

By the end of 1952, three individual highways were numbered "Highway 401": the partially completed Toronto Bypass between Weston Road and Highway 11 (Yonge Street); Highway 2A between West Hill and Newcastle; and the Scenic Highway between Gananoque and Brockville, now known as the Thousand Islands Parkway. These three sections of highway were 11.8, 54.7 and 41.2 km, (7.3, 34.0 and 25.6 mi), respectively. In 1964, the route became fully navigable from Windsor to the Ontario–Quebec border. In 1965 it was given a second designation, the Macdonald–Cartier Freeway, in honour of two Fathers of Confederation. At the end of 1968, the Gananoque–Brockville section was bypassed and the final intersection grade-separated near Kingston, making Highway 401 a freeway for its entire 817.9-km length. Since 2007, a portion of the highway between Trenton and Toronto has been designated the Highway of Heroes, as the route is travelled by funeral convoys for fallen Canadian Forces personnel from CFB Trenton to the coroner's office.

In 2011, construction began on a westward extension called the "Rt. Hon. Herb Gray Parkway". This new route follows but does not replace, the former Highway 3 between the former end of the freeway and the E. C. Row Expressway, at which point it turns and parallels that route towards the site of the future Gordie Howe International Bridge. An  section of the parkway, east of the E. C. Row interchange, opened on June 28, 2015, with the remaining section completed and opened on November 21. In the summer of 2019, the widening of the highway between Highway/Regional Road 8 in Kitchener to Highway/Regional Road 24 in Cambridge to twelve lanes was completed.  There are plans underway to widen the remaining four-lane sections between Windsor and London to six lanes and to widen the route between Cambridge and Milton as well as through Oshawa. The expansive twelve-plus-lane collector–express system through Toronto and Pickering, and partially across Mississauga, was extended west to Milton in December 2022.

Route description 

Highway 401 extends across Southwestern, Central and Eastern Ontario. In anticipation of the future expansion of the highway, the transportation ministry purchased a  right-of-way along the entire length. Generally, the highway occupies only a portion of this allotment.
It is one of the world's busiest highways; a 2016 analysis stated the annual average daily traffic (AADT) count between Weston Road and Highway 400 in Toronto was nearly 420,000,
while a second study estimates that over 500,000 vehicles travel that section on some days. This makes it North America's busiest roadway, surpassing the Santa Monica Freeway in Los Angeles and I-75 in Atlanta. The just-in-time auto parts delivery systems of the highly integrated automotive industry of Michigan and Ontario have contributed to the highway's status as the world's busiest truck route, carrying 60 percent of vehicular trade between Canada and the US.

Highway 401 also features North America's busiest multi-structure bridge at Hogg's Hollow in Toronto.
The four bridges, two for each direction with the collector and express lanes, carried an average of 373,700 vehicles daily in 2006.
The highway is one of the major backbones of a network in the Great Lakes region, connecting the populous Quebec City–Windsor corridor with Michigan, New York and central Ontario's cottage country.
It is the principal connection between Toronto and Montreal, becoming Autoroute 20 at the Ontario–Quebec border.

Southwestern Ontario 
Highway 401 does not yet extend the last few kilometres to Detroit; an extension to Brighton Beach (at the Canada–US border in Windsor) was completed in November 2015, after which the Gordie Howe International Bridge will extend Highway 401 across the Canada–United States border to a connection through Delray to Interstate 75 in Michigan by the end of 2024.
At present, Highway 401 begins as a six-lane freeway at the west end of the E. C. Row Expressway. At the Dougall Parkway, the highway turns east and exits Windsor. From here, Highway 401 mostly parallels the former route of Highway 98 from Windsor to Tilbury.

Southwestern Ontario is flat, primarily agricultural land, that takes advantage of the fertile clay soil deposited throughout the region.
The main river through the region is the Thames River, which drains the second largest watershed in southern Ontario and largely influences the land use surrounding the highway.
It parallels the route to the north between Tilbury and Woodstock.

Near Tilbury, Highway 401 loses its tall wall median barrier and narrows to four lanes, following lot lines laid between concession roads in a plan designed to limit damage to the sensitive agricultural lands through which the highway runs.
Here the highway's flat and straight route is notorious for leading to driver inattention.
The section from Windsor to London (especially west of Tilbury) has become known for deadly car accidents and pile-ups, earning it the nickname Carnage Alley.
As the highway approaches London, Highway 402 merges in, resulting in a six-lane cross-section.
Within London, it intersects the city's two municipal expressways, Highbury Avenue and the Veterans Memorial Parkway.

The section between London and Woodstock generally parallels the former Highway 2 but lies on the south side of the Thames River. This area is not as flat but the highway is generally straight. This part of Highway 401 often experiences heavy snowsqualls in early winter, sometimes extending as far east as Toronto. To the south of Woodstock, Highway 401 curves northeast and the western terminus of Highway 403 merges into it. From here the highway heads towards Kitchener and Cambridge, substantially north of the route of the former Highway 2 as Highway 403 assumes the role of paralleling the former Highway 2 all the way to Mississauga.
Heading towards Kitchener the highway intersects with Highway 8 and returns to its eastward orientation.  Between Highway/Regional Road 8 and Highway/Regional Road 24 in Cambridge, the highway was widened in 2020 to twelve lanes to accommodate the growing traffic using that segment.
Beyond Highway/Regional Road 24, the highway returns to a six-lane cross section and meanders towards Milton, passing through hills and rock cuts along the way.

Greater Toronto Area 

As Highway 401 approaches the Greater Toronto Area (GTA), it descends through the ecologically protected Niagara Escarpment to the west of Milton.
Upon entering the town, it enters the first urbanized section of the GTA, passing through two rural areas between there and Oshawa. Part of this rural gap is the western side of Toronto's Greenbelt, a zone around Toronto protected from development. After this  gap, the highway interchanges with the Highway 407 Express Toll Route. Within the GTA, the highway passes several major shopping malls including Yorkdale Shopping Centre, Scarborough Town Centre and Pickering Town Centre.

Highway 401 widens into a collector-express system (the first of three distinct sets) as it approaches James Snow Parkway in Milton, a concept inspired by the Dan Ryan Expressway in Chicago. The system divides each direction of travel into collector and express lanes,
giving the highway a wide span and four carriageways. To avoid confusion between carriageways, blue signs are used for the collector lanes and green signs for the express lanes. Unlike the collector lanes, which provide access to every interchange, the express lanes only provide direct access to a select few interchanges. Access between the two is provided by transfers, which are strategically placed to prevent disruptions caused by closely spaced interchanges.
The overall purpose of the collector-express system is to maximize traffic flow for both local and long-distance traffic. In addition, Highway 401 was equipped with a traffic camera system called COMPASS in early 1991.
Using closed-circuit television cameras, vehicle detection loops and LED changeable-message signs, COMPASS enables the MTO Traffic Operations Centre to obtain a real-time assessment of traffic conditions and alert drivers of collisions, congestion and construction.
The system stretches from the Highway 403 / 410 interchange in Mississauga to Harwood Avenue in Ajax.

Three sets of collector-express systems exist in the GTA.
This system was originally designed to accommodate and organize various traffic movements from the Highway 403 / 410 and Highway 427 interchanges along Highway 401, replacing an earlier plan that would have run Highway 403 directly to Eglinton Avenue and the never-built Richview Expressway.
East of the interchange with Renforth Drive, the collector lanes diverge to become the on-ramps to Highway 427 northbound and southbound. The third  system starts from Highway 409 and passes through the centre of Toronto, ending at Brock Road in Pickering to the east.
The  gap between the second and third systems is a traffic bottleneck as the freeway narrows to only 8 lanes beneath Highway 427. However, the interchange with Highway 427 cannot accommodate future widening of Highway 401.

Highway 401 widens to 18 lanes south of Toronto Pearson International Airport. Progressing eastward, eight lanes are carried beneath the large spaghetti junction at Highway 427. The highway curves northeast and follows a power transmission corridor to Highway 409, which merges with the mainline and forms the collector lanes. It returns to its eastward route through Toronto, now carrying 12–16 lanes of traffic on four carriageways.
Highway 401 is often congested in this section, with an average of 442,900 vehicles passing between Weston Road and Highway 400 per day as of 2008. In spite of this congestion, it is the primary commuting route in Toronto; over 50 percent of vehicles bound for downtown Toronto use the highway.
East of Highway 400 is The Basketweave, as each direction has a criss-crossing transfer between the express and collectors carriageways. Near Yorkdale Shopping Centre, twelve lanes pass beneath a complicated interchange with Allen Road, built to serve the cancelled Spadina Expressway. Further east, the highway crosses Hogg's Hollow, over the West Don River and Yonge Street in the centre of Toronto, the busiest multi-span bridge crossing in North America, surpassing the Brooklyn Bridge. It then crosses the East Don River and climbs toward an interchange with the Don Valley Parkway and Highway 404, which provides access to downtown Toronto and the suburbs to the north, respectively.

Progressing eastward in Scarborough, the Highway 401 continues through mostly residential areas and Scarborough City Centre including the shopping mall, eventually reaching the city's eastern edge where former Highway 2A merges into it at a vast interchange with Kingston Road and Port Union Road, and crossing the Rouge Valley into Pickering.

West of Pickering, Highway 401 again meets former Highway 2, which thereafter parallels it to the Ontario–Quebec border. As the highway approaches Brock Road in Pickering, the collector and express lanes converge, narrowing the 14-lane cross-section to 10, divided only at the centre.
It remains this width as it passes into Ajax,
before narrowing to six lanes at Salem Road.
Planned expansions east of Salem to improve flow leading into the Highway 412 and Lakeridge Road interchanges will see the highway widened to ten lanes as far as Brock Street in Whitby, where the existing interchange will be reconfigured.

East of Ajax, the highway passes through the second 3.5 km (2.1 mi) rural gap, and enters Whitby. The stretch of Highway 401 through Whitby and Oshawa features several structures completed during the initial construction of the highway in the 1940s. Several of these structures are to be demolished, either due to their age, or to prepare for the planned widening of Highway 401 through this area.
A former Canadian National Railway overpass, which was fenced off but commonly used by pedestrians during Highway of Heroes repatriations, was demolished on the night of June 11, 2011. A second structure in Bowmanville was demolished during two overnight closures on July 9 and 16.
At Harmony Road, the suburban surroundings quickly transition to agricultural land. The highway curves around the south side of Bowmanville and travels towards Highway 35 and Highway 115.

Eastern Ontario 

From east of Highway 35 and Highway 115 to Cobourg, Highway 401 passes through a mix of agricultural land and forests, maintaining a straight course.
Highway 401 passes through the north end of the towns of Port Hope and Cobourg with two interchanges each. Just east of Cobourg, the highway narrows to four lanes and the terrain becomes undulating, with the highway routed around hills and through valleys along the shores of Lake Ontario.
At Trenton, the highway crosses the Trent Canal and returns to an agricultural setting. It then crosses the Moira River as it goes through Belleville before heading eastward to Kingston. The Kingston portion of the highway, originally named the Kingston-Bypass, was one of the first sections of the highway to be completed; it is now mostly three lanes each way.

East of Kingston, the highway continues through a predominantly agricultural area alongside the St. Lawrence River to Gananoque, where it splits with the Thousand Islands Parkway, one of the original sections of the highway designated in 1952. The highway runs parallel to the parkway several kilometres inland from the river. The Canadian Shield, an ancient geological formation, appears through this heavily forested section of the highway. Highway 401 rejoins the Thousand Islands Parkway immediately southwest of Brockville, now heading northeast.

The remainder of the highway runs parallel to the former Highway 2 along the shore of the St. Lawrence River within the St. Lawrence Valley. Northeast of Brockville is the interchange with Highway 416, which heads north to Ottawa. At the Ontario–Quebec border, Highway 401 becomes Autoroute 20 and continues to Montreal.

Traffic volume 
The MTO publishes yearly traffic volume data for provincial highways, expressed as an average daily vehicle count over the span of a year (AADT).
The table below compares the AADT at several locations along Highway 401 using data from 1969, 1988, 2008 and 2016.

History

Predecessors 

Highway 401's history predates its designation by over two decades. As automobile use in southern Ontario grew in the early 20th century, road design and construction advanced significantly. Following frequent erosion of Lake Shore Road, then macadamized,
a concrete road known as the Toronto–Hamilton Highway was proposed in January 1914.
The highway was designed to run along the lake shore, instead of Dundas Street to the north, because the numerous hills encountered along Dundas would have increased costs without improving accessibility. Middle Road, a dirt lane named because of its position between the two, was not considered since Lake Shore and Dundas were both overcrowded and in need of serious repairs.
It was the first concrete road in Ontario, as well as one of the longest stretches of concrete road between two cities in the world.

Over the next decade, vehicle usage increased substantially, and by 1920, Lakeshore Road was again congested, particularly during weekends.
In response, the Department of Highways examined improving another road between Toronto and Hamilton.
Construction on what was then known as the Queen Street Extension west of Toronto began in early 1931.

Before the highway could be completed, Thomas McQuesten was appointed the new minister of the Department of Highways, with Robert Melville Smith as deputy minister, following the 1934 provincial elections.
Smith, inspired by the German autobahns—new "dual-lane divided highways"—modified the design for Ontario roads,
and McQuesten ordered the Middle Road be converted into this new form of highway.
A  right-of-way was purchased along the Middle Road and construction began to convert the existing sections to a divided highway. Work also began on Canada's first interchange at Highway 10.

Beginning in 1935, McQuesten applied the concept of a dual-highway to several projects along Highway 2, including along Kingston Road in Scarborough Township.
When widening in Scarborough reached the Highland Creek ravine in 1936, the Department of Highways began construction on a new bridge over the large valley, bypassing the former alignment around West Hill.
From here the highway was constructed on a new alignment to Oshawa, avoiding construction on the congested Highway 2. As grading and bridge construction neared completion on the new highway between West Hill and Oshawa in September 1939, World War II broke out and gradually tax revenues were re-allocated from highway construction to the war effort.

At the same time, between September 6 and 8, 1939, the Ontario Good Roads Association Conference was held at Bigwin Inn, near Huntsville,
drawing highway engineers from across North America to discuss the new concept of "Dual Highways." On the first day of the convention, McQuesten announced his vision of the freeway: an uninterrupted drive through the scenic regions of Ontario, discouraging local business and local traffic from accessing the highway except at infrequent controlled-access points.
It was announced in the days thereafter this concept would be applied to a new "trans-provincial expressway", running from Windsor to the Ontario–Quebec border.

Highway engineers evaluated factors such as grading, curve radius, and the narrow median used along the Middle Road—which was inaugurated on August 23, 1940 as the Queen Elizabeth Way (QEW)—and began to plan the course of a new dual highway mostly parallel to Highway 2, with precedence given to areas most hampered by congestion. Unlike the QEW, this highway would not be built along an existing road, but rather on a new right-of-way, avoiding the need to provide access to properties.
Along with immense improvements to machinery and construction techniques over its six-year course, the war provided planners an opportunity to conduct a survey of 375,000 drivers, asking them about their preferred route to travel to their destination. Using this information, a course was plotted from Windsor to Quebec, bypassing all towns along the way.

Highway 2S (S for Scenic) was the first completed section of new roadway. Built to connect with the Thousand Islands Bridge at Ivy Lea and opened as a gravel road in late 1941 or early 1942,
the road followed the shore of the Saint Lawrence River and connected with the western end of the twinned Highway 2 near Brockville.
In addition, the highway between Highland Creek and Oshawa was opened as a gravel-surfaced road in May 1942.

Following the war, construction resumed on roadways throughout Ontario. The expressway between Highland Creek and Oshawa was completed in December 1947, while other sections languished. The Toronto–Barrie Highway was the primary focus of the Department of Highways at the time, and the onset of the Korean War in 1950 stalled construction again. Despite the delays, highway minister George Doucett officially announced the plans for construction of the new trans-provincial expressway that year, with the Toronto to Oshawa expressway serving as a model for the design. Work on the most important link, the Toronto Bypass, began in 1951, but it would not open with that name.

Assumption 
In July 1952 (possibly July 1, the same day Highway 400 was numbered),
the Highland Creek to Oshawa expressway and Highway 2S were designated Controlled-Access Highway No 401, a move scorned by one critic because of the lack of thought given to the numbered name.
Construction was completed for several sections of the Toronto Bypass: between Highway 400 and Dufferin Street in August, west to Weston Road in September, east to Bathurst Street in October and finally to Yonge Street in December.
Extensions east and west began in 1953; the eastern extension to Bayview Avenue opened in April 1955, but the western extension was delayed by the damage caused by Hurricane Hazel on October 15, 1954, which nearly destroyed the new bridge over the Humber River. The reconstruction would take until July 8, 1955,
and the highway was opened between Weston and Highway 27 in September 1955.

The entire bypass, including the widening of Highway 27 into an expressway south of Highway 401,
was completed in August 1956.
Upon its opening, the bypass was described by one reporter as "a motorist's dream" providing "some of the most soothing scenery in the Metropolitan area". The reporter continued, with regard to the eastern section through Scarborough, that it "winds smoothly through pastures across streams and rivers, and beside green thickets. It seems a long way from the big city."
By 1959 however, the bypass was a lineup of cars, as 85,000 drivers crowded the roadway, designed to handle a maximum of 48,000 vehicles, on a daily basis.
Motorists found the new road to be a convenient way of travelling across Toronto; this convenience helped influence the suburban shift in the city and continues to be a driving force of urban sprawl today.

Meanwhile, beyond Toronto, the highway was being built in a patchwork fashion, focusing on congested areas first. Construction west from Highway 27 began in late 1954,
as did the Kingston Bypass in Eastern Ontario.
Work began to connect the latter with the Scenic Highway in 1955.
After the 1954 New York State Thruway opened from Buffalo to New York City, Michigan officials encouraged Ontario to bypass Highway 3 as the most direct path from Detroit to Buffalo.
By 1956, construction had begun on a segment between Highway 4 in London and Highway 2 in Woodstock, as well as on the section between Windsor and Tilbury.

In 1958, a section bypassing Morrisburg was opened to accommodate traffic displaced from a portion of Highway 2 through The Lost Villages of the Saint Lawrence Seaway.

By the end of 1960, the Toronto section of the highway was extended both eastwards and westwards: first east from Newcastle to Port Hope on June 30; then later west from Highway 25 in Milton to Highway 8 south of Kitchener on November 17.
By mid-1961, the section between Brighton and Marysville had opened. The gap to the east, from Highway 28 in Port Hope to Highway 30 in Brighton was opened on July 20 of that year.

The gap between Woodstock and Kitchener was completed on November 9, 1961, while the gap between Tilbury and London was completed two lanes at a time; the westbound lanes on October 22, 1963, the eastbound on July 20, 1965. The gap between Marysville and Kingston was opened by 1962.
The final sections, from west of Cornwall to Lancaster, were opened between 1962 and 1964;
two lanes opened to Lancaster on September 11, 1962, but the other two were not completed until July 31, 1964. The last segment, to the Ontario–Quebec border, was opened on November 10, 1964.
Finally, on October 11, 1968, the Thousand Islands Bypass opened. This final piece was commemorated with a plaque to signify the completion of Highway 401.

Expansion 

In Toronto, engineers and surveyors were examining the four-lane bypass, while planners set about designing a way to handle the commuter highway. In 1963, transportation minister Charles MacNaughton announced the widening of Highway 401 in Toronto from four to a minimum of 12 lanes between Islington Avenue and Markham Road. The design was taken from the Dan Ryan Expressway in Chicago, which was widened into a similar configuration around the same time. Construction began immediately. While the plan initially called for construction to end in 1967, it continued for nearly a decade. At least four lanes were always open during the large reconstruction project, which included complex new interchanges at Highway 27, Highway 400, the planned Spadina Expressway and the Don Valley Parkway. The system was completed in 1972, along with the Highway 27 (renamed Highway 427) bypass between the QEW and Pearson Airport. Most of the interchanges in Toronto were reconstructed as partial cloverleafs and a continuous lighting system was installed.

On January 11, 1965, at the dinner celebration of Sir John A. Macdonald's 150th birthday, the Premier of Ontario John Robarts designated Highway 401 the Macdonald–Cartier Freeway to honour Macdonald and George-Étienne Cartier, two of Canada's Fathers of Confederation.
Unlike other names later applied to the highway, the Macdonald–Cartier Freeway designation covers the entire length of Highway 401. Signs designating the freeway and shields with the letters 'M-C' were installed, but these had been removed by 1997.
In 2003, 38 years after Robarts' naming of the highway, a Member of Provincial Parliament attempted to get the Macdonald-Cartier Freeway highway name enshrined into law; the bill only passed first reading and was not enacted.

In the 1970s, Highway 401 was widened to six lanes in Durham. Between 1977 and 1982, Highway 401 was widened from four to six lanes between Hurontario Street (Highway 10) to Highway 25, with the Jersey median barrier making its debut in Ontario in that segment.

The 1980s saw more sections widened.  Most significant was the new collector-express system between Highway403/ 410 and Highway427, including a new set of flyover ramps from the express lanes to Highway 403 which opened in 1984, while a basketweave transfer between the eastbound collector and express lanes near Pearson Airport was completed in mid-1985.
After the Kennedy Road overpass was replaced, cast-in-place concrete flyover ramps were constructed from 1988 to late 1990 to link up Highway 401 and Highway 410, notably the 11-span flyover ramp from Highway 401 eastbound to Highway 410 northbound which remains the longest in the Greater Toronto Area, while the Highway 410 southbound to Highway 401 eastbound flyover replaced a loop ramp.  In the fall of 1991, alongside the widening of Highway 410 into a full freeway, construction began on the connecting ramps between Highway 403 and Highway 410, which pass under the existing bridge structures carrying Highway 401 (which would soon be designated as the collector lanes), while new overpasses were constructed for the Highway 401 express lanes which were extended from east of Tomken Road to just east of Kennedy Road.

Plans were made to extend the eastern system from Neilson Road to Brock Road in Pickering in the late 1980s,
but took over a decade to reach fruition by 1997.
This was followed shortly thereafter by the widening of the highway through Ajax and a new interchange at Pickering Beach Road (renamed Salem Road) and Stevenson Road.

The 1990s also saw the first step in widening the highway from Toronto to London, by replacing the grass median with the addition of a third traffic lane per direction separated by a tall-wall concrete median barrier. The segment from London to Woodstock received this upgrade first, with the expansion ending near the terminus of Highway 403's newly constructed western segment.
A project in the mid-1990s brought the highway up to a minimum of six lanes between Highway 8 in Kitchener and Highway 35 / 115 in Newcastle.
Other projects prepared sections for eventual widening.
 
In its 2007 plan for southern Ontario, the MTO announced long-term plans to create high-occupancy vehicle (HOV) lanes from Mississauga Road west to Milton;
by 2011 these plans had been expanded in scope to as far west as Hespeler Road in Cambridge. 

In the late 1990s, several prerequisite projects were undertaken for the future widening of Highway 401 throughout Mississauga, including a new underpass structure to accommodate Derry Road which was widened from two to six lanes (1996–97), the addition of an interchange with the Mavis Road extension in 1999 whose overpass was designed to be lengthened with two outer spans, and replacing the Mississauga Road overpass which began on February 15, 2002  (in a cost-sharing agreement between the province and Peel Region) and completed in 2003, although that section of the freeway would retain its six-lane cross section for the next decade. More recent work included the replacement of the McLaughlin Road overpass in 2008. Starting in 2009, Highway 401's collector-express lanes in Mississauga have been extended westward beyond its initial terminus at Highway 410.  The widening of this 7 km segment to the Credit River necessitated the replacement of several existing overpasses, including those of Hurontario Street (2013) and Second Line West (2016), with the Second Line West crossing rebuilt as a pedestrian/cyclist bridge since most vehicular traffic was already rerouted to the Mavis Road extension. Tying into this extension of Highway 401's collector-express system, the missing ramps from Highway 401 eastbound to Highway 403 westbound and the opposite movement were completed in 2018 which also provided direct access to Cawthra Road, making the Highway 401-403-410 junction a full four-way interchange.
while the second phase to the Credit River was completed in 2020.

A successful construction consortium was announced in 2019 for expanding the route from the Credit River to Regional Road 25 in Milton to a minimum of 10 lanes, including an HOV lane. This project included extending the existing 12-lane collector–express system from the Credit River to just east of Winston Churchill Boulevard, while another 12-lane collector–express system was built from just west of the Highway 407 interchange to just east of the James Snow Parkway.

Sections of the new expansion were opened overnight throughout the second half of 2022. On August13 and 14, 2022, the westbound express lanes opened between Highway407 and James Snow Parkway. The remainder of the westbound lanes, between the Credit River and Winston Churchill Boulevard, were opened several months later on November13 and 14. The eastbound express lanes between James Snow Parkway and Winston Churchill Boulevard were opened a week later on November18 and 19, and from Winston Churchill Boulevard to the Credit River on November29 and 30. The HOV lanes in both directions were opened on December9, 2022, to complete the project.

Advantage I-75 
Between June 1990 and 1998, Highway 401 and Interstate 75 were used for a pilot project named Advantage I-75 to test the reliability and versatility of an automated tracking system for transport trucks. Termed "MACS" (Mainline Automated Clearance System), it allows a truck to travel from Florida to Ontario without a second inspection.
MACS was initially tested at two truck inspection stations in Kentucky, with transponders installed in 220 trucks. Exact time, date, location, weight and axle data were logged as a truck approached an equipped station.
Following initial tests, MACS was deployed at every inspection station along I-75 from Miami to Detroit, and along Highway 401 from Windsor to Belleville in 1994. The project demonstrated the effectiveness of electronic systems in enforcing freight restrictions without delaying vehicles, while alleviating security fears such systems could be compromised. The concept has since been applied to many parts of Canada, including Highway 407's electronic tolling system.

"Carnage Alley" 

The section of Highway 401 between Windsor and London has often been referred to as Carnage Alley, in reference to the numerous crashes that have occurred throughout its history. The term became more commonplace following several deadly pileups during the 1990s. The narrow and open grass median was an ineffective obstacle in preventing cross-median collisions. The soft shoulders consisted of gravel, with sharp slopes which were blamed for facilitating vehicle rollovers.
The nature of that section of highway, described as a mainly straight road with a featureless agricultural landscape, was said to make drivers feel less involved and lose focus on the road. In winter, the area between Woodstock and Chatham is also subject to sudden snow squalls from lake-effect snow.
Several collisions have resulted from motorists deviating from their lane and losing control of their vehicles.

Various other names, including The Killer Highway circulated for a time,
but Carnage Alley became predominant following an 87-vehicle pile-up on September 3, 1999 (the start of Labour Day weekend), the worst in Canadian history, that resulted in eight deaths and 45 injured individuals.

Only a few days prior, then-Transportation Minister David Turnbull had deemed the highway "pleasant" to drive.
On the morning of September 3, the local weather station reported clear conditions due to a malfunction, while a thick layer of fog rolled onto the highway. Dozens of vehicles, including several semi-trailers, quickly crashed into each other shortly after 8 a.m., one following another in the dense fog, with collisions in both directions at that segment of Highway 401, although no vehicles crossed the highway's median.
Immediately following the crash, the MTO installed paved shoulders with rumble strips
and funded additional police to patrol the highway, a move criticized as being insufficient.

Beginning in 2004,  of the highway was widened from four asphalt lanes to six concrete lanes, paved shoulders were added, and a concrete Ontario Tall Wall median was installed,
which was the solution the Canadian Automobile Association promoted in 1999. Interchanges were improved and signage was upgraded as part of a five-phase project to improve Highway 401 from Highway 3 in Windsor to Essex County Road 42 (formerly Highway 2) on the western edge of Tilbury.
From 2008 to 2010, with joint funding from the provincial and federal governments, the section of Highway 401 from Dougall Parkway (former Highway 3B) to Provincial Road (former Highway 98) was widened to six lanes, necessitating the replacement of the Walker Road and Provincial Road underpasses for the freeway's elevated section. As part of that project, the Dougall Parkway split with Highway 401 was reconfigured, replacing a one-lane 1950s-era underpass tunnel with a modern high-speed flyover ramp. The old interchange had reduced eastbound Highway 401 traffic to one lane as it merged with Dougall Parkway, whereas the new interchange allows three lanes per direction of Highway 401 to pass through.

Highway of Heroes 

On August 24, 2007, the MTO announced the stretch of Highway 401 between  Miller Road in Trenton and the intersection of the Don Valley Parkway and Highway 404 in Toronto would bear the additional name Highway of Heroes (French: Autoroute des héros), in honour of Canadian soldiers who have died,
though Highway 401 in its entirety remains designated as the Macdonald–Cartier Freeway.
This length of the highway is often travelled by a convoy of vehicles carrying a fallen soldier's body, with his or her family, from CFB Trenton to the coroner's office at the Centre for Forensic Sciences in Toronto. Since 2002, when the first fallen Canadian soldiers were repatriated from Afghanistan, crowds have lined the overpasses to pay their respects as convoys pass.

The origin of the name can be traced to an article in the Toronto Sun on June 23, 2007, by columnist Joe Warmington, in which he interviewed Northumberland photographer Pete Fisher. Cobourg resident Ron Flindall was responsible for organizing the first bridge salutes following the loss of four soldiers on April 18, 2002.

Warmington described the gathering of crowds on overpasses to welcome fallen soldiers as a "highway of heroes phenomena".
This led a Cramahe Township volunteer firefighter to contact Fisher on July 10 about starting a petition, leading Fisher to publish an article which was posted to the Northumberland Today website.
The online article eventually caught the attention of London resident Jay Forbes. Forbes began a petition, which received over 20,000 signatures before being brought to the Minister of Transportation on August 22.
Following the announcement on August 24, the provincial government and MTO set out to design new signs. The signs were erected and unveiled on September 7, and include a smaller reassurance marker (shield), as well as a larger billboard version.

On September 27, 2013, the Highway of Heroes designation was extended west to Keele Street in Toronto, to coincide with the move of the coroner's office to the new Forensic Services and Coroner's Complex at the Humber River Hospital.

Highway improvements and safety concerns

London and Kitchener 

Between 2006 and 2008, Highway 401 was widened from four to six lanes between Highway 402 and Wellington Road in London. This included reconfiguring the Wellington Road interchange from a cloverleaf to a Parclo A4 while replacing the original 1956 overpass with a longer and wider structure.

In November 2010, the widening of Highway 401 from four to six lanes between Woodstock and Kitchener was completed after many years of planning and construction.
The project included the installation of a tall-wall median barrier, straightening curves and adding additional interchanges on the freeway, allowing it to be easily vacated in an emergency event.

Greater Toronto Area 

Beginning in 1998, several projects were initiated on Highway 401 within Toronto. The freeway's pavement through the city was resurfaced. The most significant construction work was widening the route from six to eight lanes though the Highway 427 interchange in 2005, which necessitated the replacement of the Highway 27 underpass, although the rest of the junction's flyovers could accommodate the expansion. Some projects have been completed during overnight construction projects, including the widening and rehabilitation of the Hogg's Hollow bridge,
the replacement of the original gantries throughout the collector-express system, and rehabilitating the flyover ramps of the Highway 401 / 400 interchange.

On August 10, 2008, following a series of explosions at a propane facility in Toronto, Highway 401 was closed between Highway 400 and Highway 404 as a precautionary measure, the largest closure of the highway in its history.
The highway remained closed until 8 p.m., though several exits near the blast remained closed thereafter.

In Oshawa, exit 416 (Park Road) was replaced by a new interchange at exit 415 (Stevenson Road).
The westbound ramps were opened in mid-September 2007
and the eastbound ramps in mid-2009. The resurfacing was completed mid-2010.

In 2013, as a prerequisite to construction of the West Durham Link which was eventually numbered as Highway 412, the section of Highway 401 near the Lake Ridge Road overpass was shifted northward on a new alignment away from the parallel railway line to allow sufficient right-of-way for the interchange to the new route. The interchange to Highway 412 opened on June 20, 2016.

Rt. Hon. Herb Gray Parkway 
  

In 2004, a joint announcement by the federal government of the United States and Government of Canada confirmed a new border crossing would be constructed between Detroit and Windsor. The Detroit River International Crossing (DRIC) was formed as a bi-national committee to manage the project.
The MTO took advantage of this opportunity to extend Highway401 to the Canada–US border and began an environmental impact assessment on the entire project in late 2005.
The City of Windsor also hired New York traffic consultant Sam Schwartz to design a parkway to the border. Schwartz's proposal would eventually inspire the DRIC's own design, but his route was not chosen, with the DRIC opting instead to take a northern route.
On February8, 2008, the MTO announced it had begun purchasing property south of the E.C. Row Expressway, upsetting many area residents who had purchased properties in the years prior.

On March3, 2008, the Michigan Department of Transportation and the MTO (in partnership with Transport Canada, the Federal Highway Administration of the United States and the Detroit River International Crossing group) completed a joint assessment on the soils along the Detroit River and determined they could indeed support the weight of a new bridge; the stability of the underlying soil and clay and the impact of the nearby Windsor Salt Mine had caused concern for all parties involved in the project.

Despite protest from area residents,
as well as a dismissed lawsuit from Ambassador Bridge owner Matty Moroun,
it was announced on May1, 2008, that a preferred route had been selected and the new route would be named the Windsor–Essex Parkway.
The new parkway is below-grade and has six through-lanes. From there, it turns northwest and follows a new alignment to the border.
Internally, the new parkway was numbered Highway7901.
Initial construction of a noise barrier from North Talbot Road to Howard Avenue began in March 2010; full construction began on August19, 2011.

On November28, 2012, the Ministry of Transportation announced a Federal Order in Council was passed to change the name of the parkway to the "Rt. Hon. Herb Gray Parkway", in honour of the Right Honourable Herb Gray, a Member of Parliament from Windsor.
In early 2015, it was announced the parkway would open to traffic between Highway3 and Labelle Street (near the E.C. Row Expressway) in the spring;
an  section was opened to traffic on June28, extending Highway401 as far west as the E.C. Row Expressway. It was the first new segment of the highway to be opened since the Thousand Islands Parkway bypass in 1968.
The stretch to Ojibway Parkway was opened on November21,
completing the parkway as far as the planned bridge approach and border plaza.
Construction on projects related to the Gordie Howe International Bridge began in 2015 with an initial completion date in 2019–20.
The "Bridging North America" consortium was selected to build the bridge in July 2018, with construction beginning immediately.
The Gordie Howe International Bridge is expected to be completed by the end of 2024.

Future

Southwestern Ontario 

In Southwestern Ontario, several improvements are under way to provide six lanes on Highway 401 from Windsor to Toronto,
in response to the 1999 Highway 401 crash in Carnage Alley.
West of  Essex County Road 42 on the west of Tilbury, the highway has been widened to six lanes with a concrete divider in anticipation of the Rt. Hon. Herb Gray Parkway.

Within the London area, traffic volumes are expected to increase considerably, leading to poor highway conditions. The province has put in place an extensive plan to widen and reconstruct the London corridor between 2006 and 2021. This included building a new interchange with Wonderland Road which opened in November 2015 to help improve access to Highway 401 westbound from the city's southwest end and involved replacing the Westminster Drive overpass to allow the highway to be widened. A reconstruction of the outdated cloverleaf interchange at Colonel Talbot Road and widening Highway 401 from four to six lanes between Highway 4 and Highway 402 is also proposed. The MTO is also planning on widening Highway 401 from six to eight lanes through part of the London corridor.

In the Kitchener/Cambridge area, the Y-junction between Highway 401 and Highway 8 Expressway is to be expanded to a full all-directional interchange, with flyover ramps linking eastbound Highway 401 to Highway 8 towards Kitchener and Highway 8 traffic towards Toronto to westbound Highway 401 to bypass the existing connection using King Street, giving Highway 401 direct freeway access to the Conestoga Parkway. The widening of Highway 401 from six to twelve lanes from Highway 8 (King Street) to Highway/Regional Road 24 (Hespeler Road) commenced on June 8, 2015 and concluded in summer 2019.  The second phase of expansion scheduled for 2019-21 will see Highway 401 widened from six to ten lanes between Highway/Regional Road 24 and Townline Road. At the interchange with Highway 24 (Hespeler Road), the span carrying northbound traffic which opened in 1989 was torn down on May 1, 2021, with both directions of Highway 24 traffic temporarily relocated to the overpass originally built in 1960 and designated for southbound drivers since 1989, as a new overpass is being constructed to accommodate Highway 401's expanded cross-section.

Greater Toronto Area 

Expansion in Durham includes widening the highway to 12 lanes, and extending the collector-express system from its end at Brock Road in Pickering to Lake Ridge Road in Whitby.
A Transportation Environmental Study Report was completed on widening highway 401, extending the collector-express system easterly through to the Highway 412 interchange in Whitby, then ten lanes easterly to Liberty Street in the Municipality of Clarington. The assessment was completed in March 2015.  From Liberty Street in Clarington to Highway 35/115, Highway 401 was widened from six to eight lanes.

To support this widening, all of the original overpasses dating back in the 1940s and 1950s built through Whitby and Oshawa was replaced with new overpasses as part of modern highway safety standards and to allow for a future highway widening.

Eastern Ontario 
East of Durham, the MTO is planning to widen parts of Highway 401 to six lanes. Two bridges have been widened in advance of an eventual widening to six lanes of the highway including the bridges over the Trent River in Trenton, as well as the Salmon River bridge between Belleville and Napanee.
By 2020, the highway was widened to six lanes for  through Kingston between exits 611 and 623.

Services 

Highway 401 features 19 ONroute service centres operated under contract from the Ministry of Transportation. They provide a place to park, rest, eat and refuel 24hours a day. Service centres along Highway 401 were first announced in 1961 following public outcry over the lack of rest stops. The centres were originally leased to and operated by several major gasoline distributors; however, those companies chose not to renew their leases as the terms ended.

In response, the MTO put the operation of the full network of service centres out for tender, resulting in a 50-year lease agreement in 2010 with Host Kilmer Service Centres, a joint venture between hospitality company HMSHost (a subsidiary of Autogrill) and investment company Kilmer van Nostrand.

Seventeen of the centres along Highway 401 have been reconstructed entirely. Two centres rebuilt in the late 1990s, specifically Newcastle and Ingersoll, were not redeveloped at that time. Work on rebuilding 15 of the 17 service centres began in late 2009 or early 2010. The new service centres, opened in phases beginning in July 2010, feature a Canadian Tire gas station, an HMSHost-operated convenience store known as "The Market", as well as fast food brands such as Tim Hortons, A&W, Pizza Pizza, Extreme Pita, KFC, Taco Bell, Big Smoke Burger and Burger King.

Exit list

See also 

 Heavy Rescue: 401—a documentary/reality series on Discovery Channel in Canada and The Weather Channel in the United States highlighting the operations of heavy rescue and recovery towing businesses along the highway and nearby roads.
 Southern Ontario Transportation

Explanatory notes

Citations

General bibliography

Books

Maps

External links

Official websites 
 Ministry of Transportation of Ontario
 Live MTO Traffic Cameras

Photos and additional information 
 Highway 401 at thekingshighway.ca
 Highway 401 at OntHighways
 Highway 401 at vintagekingshighways.com (archived 30 December 2009)

1947 establishments in Ontario
01
Expressways in Canada
Roads in London, Ontario
Roads in Mississauga
Toronto highways
Transport in Cambridge, Ontario
Transport in Cornwall, Ontario
Transport in Kingston, Ontario
Roads in Kitchener, Ontario
Transport in Oshawa